Priscillano "Pres" Antonio Romanillos (January 11, 1963 – July 17, 2010) was an American animator who had a long and successful career at studios such as DreamWorks and Walt Disney. He was responsible for breathing life into many memorable animated characters including the Native American Little Creek in DreamWorks' Spirit: Stallion of the Cimarron, Pocahontas, and the villainous Hun Shan-Yu in Disney's Mulan.

Early life
Romanillos was born on January 11, 1963, in Zamboanga City in the Philippines. When he was six years old, His family moved to Queens, New York City, where he grew up. As a boy, his older brother Bob had begun an art correspondence course but he eventually lost interest in it, leaving the younger Romanillos to try out the assignments himself. Later he enrolled at the School of Visual Arts in Manhattan, successfully graduating with a master's degree in Fine Art.

Career in Animation

Disney
In 1989, Romanillos was hired by Disney Animation, who were at the time actively recruiting animators. He began as an animation trainee, working on many Disney films, including The Little Mermaid (1989), The Rescuers Down Under (1990), Beauty and the Beast (1991), Aladdin (1992), Pocahontas (1995), The Hunchback of Notre Dame (1996), Mulan (1998), and The Princess and the Frog (2009). Early on he impressed many of his colleagues. Supervising animator Ruben A. Aquino met him while working on The Little Mermaid, and said of him: "from the very beginning, I was impressed by his beautiful draftsmanship, but even more by his incredible passion for animation."

On Pocahontas he was promoted to animator, working under lead animator Glen Keane, who described him as "a man who loved to draw. When he came to the edge of his paper, his pencil didn't stop; he continued to draw characters onto the wood of his animation desk." Director Eric Goldberg said of his work: "It was so beautiful, Mike [Gabriel] and I glanced at each other briefly and said, 'Yep, you're an animator'."

Eventually he was given a lead role on Disney's Mulan, working at the new studio in Florida, and creating the character of Shan-Yu, the leader of the Hun army. Mulan co-director Barry Cook described Shan-Yu as "a straight villain who needed to feel like a real threat to our heroine. Pres pulled that off in an amazing way."

In a 1998 interview Romanillos described the character he had created:
"The challenge in animating him was to convey his weight and gravity: He's like a force of impending doom. Unconsciously, I would scowl all day while I was drawing him. When I worked on Pocahontas, I would go home feeling sexy; with Shan-Yu, my wife was always asking, 'Why are you so angry?'"

DreamWorks
He was an early hire at DreamWorks when Jeffrey Katzenberg left Disney animation to start up his own studio, and worked on many DreamWorks pictures including The Road to El Dorado (2000), and Sinbad: Legend of the Seven Seas (2003). On Spirit: Stallion of the Cimarron (2002) he was given a lead role, supervising the animation of Native American Little Creek. Later, he successfully made the transition to computer animation, working on Shrek 2 (2004) and Madagascar (2005).

In 2006, he began to draw a regular blog titled "Life as a Pickle," based on the many pets he and his wife Jeannine had rescued and looked after at their home, most notably the eponymous Pickle, a rat terrier.

Illness and death
In July 2007, Romanillos traveled to Salamanca, Spain, where he assisted in setting up the Enne Animation Studio along with fellow animation artist Scott Johnston. At Enne he completed an animated short film titled The Old Chair, featuring characters from his blog.

Unfortunately, it was in Salamanca that he was diagnosed with leukemia, leading to a long battle with it. Returning to the United States, he underwent a course of chemotherapy and treatments. He was able to return to work in July 2009, this time back at the Disney studio on The Princess and the Frog.

However, he suffered a relapse in March 2010, and the escalating cost of treatment led members of the Los Angeles animation community, including fellow animator and Animation Guild President Kevin Koch, to organize an art auction known as Pres Aid, in order to raise funds to defray medical expenses. Around 150 items were donated, many of significant value, and approximately $65,000 was raised at the event.

He did not succumb to the disease until July 17, 2010, at the age of 47 years old. Jeffrey Katzenberg, Founder and CEO of DreamWorks Animation, described him as "one of the most respected and beloved artists at our studio". Steve Hulett, business representative of the Animation Guild, said of him that "If there was anyone in this wacky business who deserved another twenty or thirty years of artistic success, Pres was at or near the top of the list."

Filmography

References
Obituary in the Los Angeles Times Retrieved July 21, 2010
Pres Romanillos at IMDB.com Retrieved July 21, 2010
Obituary at BigCartoonForum Retrieved July 21, 2010
Obituary at Cartoon Brew Retrieved July 21, 2010
Article at Daily News Retrieved July 21, 2010
Obituary at Animation World Network Retrieved July 21, 2010

Notes

External links
Pres Romanillos blog Retrieved July 21, 2010
Remembering Pres at FLIP Animation blog Retrieved July 2013
Pres Aid Facebook Page Retrieved July 23, 2010

1963 births
2010 deaths
American animators
American animated film producers
Artists from Los Angeles
DreamWorks Animation people
People from Queens, New York
People from Zamboanga City
School of Visual Arts alumni
Walt Disney Animation Studios people